The Galaxy on Earth is a 2014 Chinese drama film directed by Ning Haiqiang and Shen Dong. It was released on November 15, 2014.

Cast
Li Youbin 
Faye Yu
Duan Yihong 
Wang Ruoxin 
Zhao Youliang 
Huang Meiying 
Gao Ming 
Song Chunli
Lin Miaoke 
Wu Jun
Lin Yongjian
Pu Cunxin
Jiang Kun
Xiao Xiangyu 
Chen Baoguo
Hou Shijia 
Jiang Ping

Reception

Box office
By November 21, 2014, the film had earned ¥5.40 million at the Chinese box office.

References

2014 drama films
Chinese drama films